VA-214, nicknamed the Volunteers, was a short-lived attack squadron of the U.S. Navy. It was the second squadron to bear the VA-214 designation, the first VA-214 was disestablished on 16 May 1949.

The squadron was established as Fighter Squadron VF-214 on 30 March 1955, and redesignated as VA-214 on 11 October 1956. The squadron, based at NAS Moffett Field, California, was the first West Coast squadron to make an extended deployment to WESTPAC with the new FJ-4B Fury. It was disestablished on 1 August 1958.

Aircraft assignment
The squadron first received the following aircraft on the dates shown:
 FJ-3 Fury – 31 Mar 1955
 F9F-8 Cougar – Nov 1955
 FJ-4B Fury – 18 Jun 1957

See also
Attack aircraft
List of inactive United States Navy aircraft squadrons
History of the United States Navy

References

Attack squadrons of the United States Navy
Wikipedia articles incorporating text from the Dictionary of American Naval Aviation Squadrons